The 2021 Lisboa Belém Open was a professional tennis tournament played on outdoor clay courts. It was the fifth (men) and first (women) editions of the tournament which were part of the 2021 ATP Challenger Tour and the 2021 ITF Women's World Tennis Tour. It took place in Lisbon, Portugal between 27 September and 3 October 2021.

Men's singles main-draw entrants

Seeds

 1 Rankings are as of 20 September 2021.

Other entrants
The following players received wildcards into the singles main draw:
  Pedro Araújo
  Tiago Cação
  Gonçalo Oliveira

The following player received entry into the singles main draw using a protected ranking:
  Elliot Benchetrit

The following players received entry from the qualifying draw:
  Sebastian Fanselow
  Benjamin Hassan
  Daniel Michalski
  Santiago Rodríguez Taverna

The following player received entry as a lucky loser:
  Jacopo Berrettini

Women's singles main-draw entrants

Seeds

 1 Rankings are as of 20 September 2021.

Other entrants
The following players received wildcards into the singles main draw:
  Carolina Azadinho
  Matilde Morais
  Sofia Pinto
  Ana Filipa Santos

The following players received entry from the qualifying draw:
  Nuria Brancaccio
  Ángela Fita Boluda
  Nicole Fossa Huergo
  Malene Helgø
  Ku Yeon-woo
  İpek Öz
  Ganna Poznikhirenko
  Andreea Prisăcariu

Champions

Men's singles

  Dmitry Popko def.  Andrea Pellegrino 6–2, 6–4.

Women's singles
  Irene Burillo Escorihuela def.  İpek Öz, 6–4, 6–0

Men's doubles

  Jeevan Nedunchezhiyan /  Purav Raja def.  Nuno Borges /  Francisco Cabral 7–6(7–5), 6–3.

Women's doubles
  Yvonne Cavallé Reimers /  Ángela Fita Boluda def.  Paula Ormaechea /  Natalija Stevanović, 3–6, 6–3, [10–4]

References

External links
 2021 Lisboa Belém Open at atptour.com
 2021 Lisboa Belém Open at ITFtennis.com
 Official website

2021 ATP Challenger Tour
2021 ITF Women's World Tennis Tour
2021 in Portuguese tennis
2021
September 2021 sports events in Portugal
October 2021 sports events in Portugal